Parliamentary elections were held in Crimea on 29 March 1998. The Communist Party of Ukraine emerged as the largest faction in the Supreme Council, with 38 of the 100 seats, although 47 seats were won by independents.

Electoral system
Prior to the elections, an amendment to the electoral law introduced a majoritarian system.

Results
As a result of the new electoral system, Crimean Tatars failed to win any seats in the Supreme Council.

References

1998 elections in Ukraine
Elections in Crimea